The 2011 Cincinnati Commandos season was the 2nd season for the Continental Indoor Football League (CIFL) franchise.

Head Coach Billy Back returned for the 2011 season, and Brian Wells, former head coach of the Miami Valley Silverbacks, was hired as Defensive Coordinator.  For 2011 the Commandos announced the signing of: Tyler Sheehan (QB), Derrick Crawford (Defensive Line), Maurice Lee (WR), Corey Clarke (WR), Brandon Harrison (WR), and Peter Warrick (WR)

Standings

Roster

Schedule

Playoff Schedule

Regular season

Week 2: vs Chicago Knights

Cincinnati opened up defense of its 2010 CIFL Championship with a convincing 53-7 victory over the Chicago Knights on March 5. Cincinnati unveiled its championship banner at The Gardens that same night and gave its fans a memorable evening. Cincinnati dominated the game from start to finish jumping out to 21-0 lead and 27-7 halftime lead. Cincinnati scored just once in the third quarter before adding three more scores in the final stanza. Cincinnati was led by two quarterbacks. Starting quarterback Tyler Sheehan was 11 of 20 for 135 yards and two touchdowns. Fellow quarterback and 2010 CIFL MVP Ben Mauk was nine of 15 for 102 yards and four touchdowns. The passing was spread around to seven receivers. The top receiver was Keynes Mincy with six receptions for 64 yards and two touchdowns. Other receivers include Brandon Boehm wo had three catches for 50 yards; George Murray had four receptions for 44 yards; and Greg Moore had two catches for 35 yards. The leading rusher was Greg Moore with 24 yards on nine carries.

Week 3: vs Marion Blue Racers

Week 4: vs Indianapolis Enforcers

On March 19, quarterback Tyler Sheehan broke a Commandos record, by throwing 8 touchdown passes against the Indianapolis Enforcers. The previous record had been 7, which Mauk achieved twice in the 2010 season.

Week 6: vs Dayton Silverbacks

Week 7: vs Port Huron Predators

Week 10: vs Dayton Silverbacks

Week 11: vs Chicago Knights

Week 12: vs Port Huron Predators

Week 13: vs Indianapolis Enforcers

Week 14: vs Marion Blue Racers

On May 29, 2011, the Commandos completed their first ever undefeated regular season, with a 50-20 win over the Marion Blue Racers, in what was a battle for first place and home field advantage throughout the CIFL Playoffs.

Playoffs

2011 1 vs 4 Semifinal Game vs. Chicago Knights

2011 CIFL Championship Game: vs. Marion Blue Racers

Award Winners
CIFL MVP - Tyler Sheehan
CIFL Offensive Player of the Year - Tyler Sheehan

References

2011 Continental Indoor Football League season
Cincinnati Commandos
American football in Ohio